Ephedrodoma is a genus of plant bugs in the family Miridae. There is one described species in Ephedrodoma, E. multilineata.

References

Further reading

 
 
 

Miridae genera
Articles created by Qbugbot
Orthotylini